Paramahamsa (Sanskrit: परमहंस, Bengali: পরমহংস, romanized: Pôromohôṅso; pronounced [pɔromoɦɔŋʃo]), also spelled paramahansa or paramhansa, is a Sanskrit religio-theological title of honour applied to Hindu spiritual teachers who have become enlightened. The title literally means "supreme swan". The swan is equally at home on land and on water; similarly, the true sage is equally at home in the realms of matter and of spirit. To be in divine ecstasy and simultaneously to be actively wakeful is the paramahamsa state; the 'royal swan' of the soul floats in the cosmic ocean, beholding both its body and the ocean as manifestations of the same Spirit. The word 'Paramahamsa' signifies one who is Awakened in all realms. Paramahamsa is the highest level of spiritual development in which a union with ultimate reality has been attained by a sannyasi.

Etymology 

Paramahamsa is a Sanskrit word translated as 'supreme swan'.  The word is compounded of Sanskrit परम parama meaning 'supreme', 'highest', or 'transcendent' (from PIE per meaning 'through', 'across', or 'beyond', cognate with English far) and Sanskrit हंस hamsa meaning 'swan or wild goose'. The prefix parama is the same element seen in Parameshwara, a title for God. In Hindic tradition, swans, are noted for characteristics of discipline, stamina, grace, and beauty. "Hamsa" may be spelled "hansa."  As described by Paramahansa Yogananda, author of "Autobiograhy of a Yogi" in which he states that hansa literally means "swan."  "The white swan," he clarifies " is mythologically represented as the vehicle or mount of Brahma the Creator.  The sacred hansa, said to have the power of extracting only milk from a mixture of milk and water, is thus a symbol of spiritual discrimination."  Yogananda adds "Ahan-sa or ‘hansa (pronounced hong-sau) is literally “I am He.” These potent SANSKRIT syllables possess a vibratory connection with the incoming and the outgoing breath. Thus with his every breath man unconsciously asserts the truth of his being."  

In keeping with the construct of Sanskrit, which often layers multiple meanings upon or within words, Hamsa may also be a religious pun or allegory with a philosophical meaning. One such etymology suggests that the words 'aham' and 'sa' are joined to become 'hamsa'; aham is 'I' or 'me' and sa is 'he', together meaning 'I am he'. Here, 'I' refers to the jivatma or jivatama, the living soul, and 'he' the paramatma or paramatama or supreme soul (the alternative spellings are due to differing Romanisations of the Sanskrit words).  This relationship reflects of Advaita philosophy, which advocates the oneness of jivatma and paramatma. The word aham is common to many Eastern religions. From aham is derived ahamkara or ego.

Mythology 
The hamsa (swan) is the vahana, the mount or vehicle, of the god Brahma. In the Vedas and the Purânas it is a symbol for the soul/Soul. The hamsa is said to be the only creature that is capable of separating milk from water once they have been mixed; symbolically this is the display of great spiritual discrimination. It is symbolic for a spiritually advanced being who is capable of controlling the breath energy in such a way that he only absorbs pure vibrations from all the different energies the world contains. To the Paramahamsa (the supreme celestial Swan) on the other hand, the whole of creation is God himself, there is nothing else but God alone. This person is a fully realized soul, completely liberated from all bonds with the world, who knows no obligations, no likes or dislikes. He is without any needs because he is completely immersed in God.

Theology 
Paramahamsa, as a religio/theological title, is applied to an adept class of Hindu renunciates, liberated, realized masters who, having attained the supreme yogic state, or nirvikalpa samādhi, can always distinguish between the Real (sa) from the unreal (ham).

The hamsa mantra indicates the sound made by the exhalation ("ha") and inhalation ("sa") of the breath.

Privileged use 
Some followers believe title cannot be assumed by oneself, but must be conferred by a recognized authority, either another individual swami who is himself esteemed as enlightened, or by a committee of spiritual leaders.

Other meaning 
Paramahaṃsa is also the title of one of the Upanishads.

Paramahamsa title personalities 
 Srila Bhaktiratna Sadhu Maharaj
 Abhiram Parmahansa
 Chandradhoja Paramahansa Dev
 Dayanidhi Paramahansa Dev
 Paramahamsa Shri Gajanan Maharaj
 Kalna Paramhansa
 Lahiri Mahasaya
 Vishuddhananda Paramahansa
 Narayana Guru
 Nigamananda Paramahansa
 Paramahamsa Hariharananda
 Paramahamsa Prajnanananda
 Paramahamsa Vishwananda
 Paramahansa Yogananda
 Paramhansa Acharya Yogiraj Balkrishananda 'Mukta-Buddha'
 Paramhansa Nikhileshwarananda
 Paramahamsa Nithyananda
 Paramhansa Swami Niranjanananda Saraswati
 Paramhansa Swami Satyasangananda Saraswati
 Paramhansa Swami Satyananda Saraswati
 Ramakrishna Paramahamsa
 Sadanand ji Paramhansa
 Sivananda paramahamsa vadakara
 Shivdharmanand Paramahansa
 Srimad Durga Prasanna Paramahansa Dev
 Akhandamandaleshwer Swarupananda Paramhansa Deva alias Babamani

Notes

References

External links

Hindu lexicon
Hindu glossary
 Hamsa - The Bar-headed Goose, Anser indicus

Titles and occupations in Hinduism
Swaminarayan Sampradaya